Jones Country is an album by American country music artist George Jones released in 1983 on the Epic Records label.

Background
The album's name was taken from an outdoor music park operated and owned by Jones in Texas near his birthplace between the years of 1983 through 1988 prior to his and his wife's return to the Nashville, Tennessee area in 1989.  Jones had operated several similar country music themed parks over the years, beginning with the short lived George Jones Rhythm Ranch in 1966 and then the Old Plantation Music Park in Lakeland, Florida in the early seventies when he'd been married to Tammy Wynette.  Jones had also opened two Possum Holler Clubs in Nashville in 1967 and 1975.  As he later recalled in his 1996 autobiography I Lived To Tell It All, one of benefits of the Jones Country park was that it took his mind off his drinking problem, which he was trying to kick:  "Returning to Texas helped me stop drinking for a while.  I went on a sobriety binge...Working on the place, I knew, would keep me busy.  The busier I was, the less I would drink.  I think my dry period lasted several months, with only an occasional slip."

Recording
Jones Country would end the singer's run of top ten LPs, peaking at number 27 on the Billboard albums chart.  Part of the reason for this may have been overexposure – it was George's seventh album in three years – although this streamline production had been common practice at CBS Records at the time, with Jones's label mates Merle Haggard and Willie Nelson also producing albums at a furious pace.  Oddly, no singles were released from Jones Country, despite Jones having scored the number one hit "I Always Get Lucky With You" earlier in the year.  As Amazon.com explains, "At the time of the album's release George's record company were just about to issue the smash hit duet with Ray Charles 'We Didn't See A Thing' from Ray Charles' Friendship album. This could have been the reason for no initial single releases from Jones Country."  The murder ballad "Radio Lover" would be released as a single six years later when it appeared (along with the cover of Jack Scott's "Burning Bridges") on the singer's 1989 album One Woman Man.  One "lost classic" that did appear on Jones Country was "You Must Have Walked Across My Mind Again", a boozy slab of hardcore honky tonk that was written by Wayne Kemp and Warren Robb with lyrics that sound like diary writing from a typical George Jones Friday night.  Jones thought so much of the song that he recorded it again on his 1992 album Walls Can Fall.  "Girl at the End of the Bar" was a cover of a John Anderson song from his debut 1980 album, John Anderson.

Reception
Jones biographer Bob Allen summed up the album, as well as the plethora of other Billy Sherrill-produced Jones LPs from this period, as "uniformly competent" but "not particularly memorable", stating that "...during the mid-1980s Sherrill and the newly clean and sober Jones – as if making up for all the fallow years – began cranking out LPs at a faster rate than any time since the singer's years of over-recorded excess on the Musicor label, when he turned out a frightening amount of junk."

30 years after the release of this LP it became the focal point of a CD reissue project on April 15, 2013 paired alongside another LP, 1984's You've Still Got a Place in My Heart, for a 2-album on-1 CD release. Unfortunately the release of those studio albums onto CD for the very first time didn't get much notice due to the death of Jones 11 days later on April 26 at the age of 81.

Track listing

External links
 George Jones' Official Website
 Record Label

1983 albums
George Jones albums
Epic Records albums
Albums produced by Billy Sherrill